Mary Jane McLeod Bethune ( McLeod; July 10, 1875 – May 18, 1955) was an American educator, philanthropist, humanitarian, womanist, and civil rights activist. Bethune founded the National Council of Negro Women in 1935, established the organization's flagship journal Aframerican Women's Journal, and presided as president or leader for a myriad of African American women's organizations including the National Association for Colored Women and the National Youth Administration's Negro Division.

She also was appointed as a national adviser to president Franklin D. Roosevelt, whom she worked with to create the Federal Council on Colored Affairs, also known as the Black Cabinet. She is well-known for starting a private school for African-American students in Daytona Beach, Florida. It later continued to develop as Bethune-Cookman University.

She was the sole African American woman officially a part of the US delegation that created the United Nations charter, and she held a leadership position for the American Women's Voluntary Services founded by Alice Throckmorton McLean.

For her lifetime of activism, she was deemed "acknowledged First Lady of Negro America" by Ebony magazine in July 1949 and was known by the Black Press as the "Female Booker T. Washington". She was known as "The First Lady of The Struggle" because of her commitment to promote better lives for African Americans.

Born in Mayesville, South Carolina, to parents who had been slaves, she started working in fields with her family at age five. She took an early interest in becoming educated; with the help of benefactors, Bethune attended college hoping to become a missionary in Africa. She started a school for African American girls in Daytona Beach, Florida. It later merged with a private institute for African American boys and was known as the Bethune-Cookman School. She maintained high standards and promoted the school with tourists and donors to demonstrate what educated African Americans could do. She was president of the college from 1923 to 1942, and from 1946 to 1947. She was one of the few women in the world to serve as a college president at that time.

Bethune was also active in women's clubs, which were strong civic organizations supporting welfare and other needs, and became a national leader. Bethune wrote prolifically, publishing in National Notes from 1924 to 1928, Pittsburgh Courier from 1937 to 1938, Aframerican Women’s Journal from 1940 to 1949, and Chicago Defender from 1948 to 1955, among others. After working on the presidential campaign for Franklin D. Roosevelt in 1932, she was invited as a member of his "Black Cabinet." She advised him on concerns of African Americans and helped share Roosevelt's message and achievements with blacks, who had historically been Republican voters since the Civil War. At the time, blacks had been largely disenfranchised in the South since the turn of the century, so she spoke to black voters across the North. Upon her death, columnist Louis E. Martin said, "She gave out faith and hope as if they were pills and she some sort of doctor."

Honors include designation of her home in Daytona Beach as a National Historic Landmark, her house in Washington, D.C. as a National Historic Site, and the installation of a memorial sculpture of her in Lincoln Park in Washington, D.C. The 17 ft bronze statue, unveiled in 1974, “is the first monument to honor an African American and a woman in a public park in Washington, D.C." The Legislature of Florida designated her in 2018 as the subject of one of Florida's two statues in the National Statuary Hall Collection.

Early life and education

Mary Jane McLeod was born in 1875 in a small log cabin near Mayesville, South Carolina, on a rice and cotton farm in Sumter County. She was the fifteenth of seventeen children born to Sam and Patsy ( McIntosh) McLeod, both former slaves. Most of her siblings had been born into slavery. Her mother worked for her former owner, and her father farmed cotton near a large house they called "The Homestead".

Her parents wanted to be independent, so they had sacrificed to buy a farm for the family. As a child, Mary would accompany her mother to deliver "white people's" wash. Allowed to go into the white children's nursery, Mary became fascinated with their toys. One day she picked up a book, and as she opened it, a white child snatched it away from her, babbling she did not know how to read. Mary decided then that the only difference between white and colored people was the ability to read and write. She was inspired to learn.

McLeod attended Mayesville's one-room black schoolhouse, Trinity Mission School, which was run by the Presbyterian Board of Missions of Freedmen. She was the only child in her family to attend school, so she taught her family what she had learned each day. To get to and from school, Mary walked five miles each day. Her teacher, Emma Jane Wilson, became a significant mentor in her life.

Wilson had attended Scotia Seminary (now Barber-Scotia College). She helped McLeod attend the same school on a scholarship, which she did from 1888-93. The following year, she attended Dwight L. Moody's Institute for Home and Foreign Missions in Chicago (now the Moody Bible Institute), hoping to become a missionary in Africa. Told that black missionaries were not needed, she planned to teach, as education was a prime goal among African Americans.

Marriage and family
McLeod married Albertus Bethune in 1898. They moved to Savannah, Georgia, where she did social work until the Bethunes moved to Florida. They had a son named Albert. Coyden Harold Uggams, a visiting Presbyterian minister, persuaded the couple to relocate to Palatka, Florida to run a mission school. The Bethunes moved in 1899; Mary ran the mission school and began an outreach to prisoners. Albertus left the family in 1907; he never got a divorce but relocated to South Carolina. He died in 1918 from tuberculosis.

Teaching career

Foundations with Lucy Craft Laney
Bethune worked as a teacher briefly at her former elementary school in Sumter County. In 1896, she began teaching at Haines Normal and Industrial Institute in Augusta, Georgia, which was part of a Presbyterian mission organized by northern congregations. It was founded and run by Lucy Craft Laney. As the daughter of former slaves, Laney ran her school with a Christian missionary zeal, emphasizing character and practical education for girls. She also accepted the boys who showed up eager to learn. Laney's mission was to imbue Christian moral education in her students to arm them for their life challenges. Of her year at Laney's school, Bethune said,

I was so impressed with her fearlessness, her amazing touch in every respect, an energy that seemed inexhaustible and her mighty power to command respect and admiration from her students and all who knew her. She handled her domain with the art of a master.

Bethune adopted many of Laney's educational philosophies, including her emphasis on educating girls and women to improve the conditions of black people: "I believe that the greatest hope for the development of my race lies in training our women thoroughly and practically." (This is a strategy being followed by organizers in numerous developing countries. Educating women raises the lives of families as a whole.) After one year at Haines, Bethune was transferred by the Presbyterian mission to the Kindell Institute in Sumter, South Carolina, where she had met her current husband.'School in Daytona
 After her marriage and move to Florida, Bethune became determined to start a school for girls. Bethune moved from Palatka to Daytona because it had more economic opportunity; it had become a popular tourist destination, and businesses were thriving. In October 1904, she rented a small house for $11.00 per month. She made benches and desks from discarded crates and acquired other items through charity. Bethune used $1.50 to start the Educational and Industrial Training School for Negro Girls. She initially had six students—five girls, aged six to twelve, and her son Albert. The school bordered Daytona's dump. Bethune, parents of students, and church members raised money by making sweet potato pies, ice cream and fried fish and selling them to crews at the dump.

In the early days, the students made ink for pens from elderberry juice and pencils from burned wood; they asked local businesses for furniture. Bethune wrote later, "I considered cash money as the smallest part of my resources. I had faith in a loving God, faith in myself, and a desire to serve." The school received donations of money, equipment, and labor from local black churches. Within a year, Bethune was teaching over 30 girls at the school.

Bethune also courted wealthy white organizations, such as the ladies' Palmetto Club. She invited influential white men to sit on her school board of trustees, gaining participation by James Gamble (of Procter & Gamble), Ransom Eli Olds (of Oldsmobile and REO MotorCompany) and Thomas H. White (of White Sewing Machines). When Booker T. Washington of the Tuskegee Institute visited in 1912, he advised her of the importance of gaining support from white benefactors for funding. Bethune had met with Washington in 1896 and was impressed by his clout with his donors.

The rigorous curriculum had the girls rise at 5:30 a.m. for Bible study. The classes in home economics and industrial skills such as dressmaking, millinery, cooking, and other crafts emphasized a life of self-sufficiency for them as women. Students' days ended at 9 pm. Soon Bethune added science and business courses, then high school-level math, English, and foreign languages.  Bethune was always seeking donations to keep her school operating; as she traveled, she was fundraising. A donation of $62,000 by John D. Rockefeller helped, as did her friendship with Franklin D. Roosevelt and his wife, who gave her entry to a progressive network.

In 1931, the Methodist Church helped the merger of her school with the boys' Cookman Institute, forming the Bethune-Cookman College, a coeducational junior college. Bethune became president. Through the Great Depression, Bethune-Cookman School continued to operate and met the educational standards of the State of Florida. Throughout the 1930s, Bethune and civil rights advocate Blake R. Van Leer worked with fellow Florida institutions to lobby for federal funding.

From 1936 to 1942, Bethune had to cut back her time as president because of her duties in Washington, DC. Funding declined during this period of her absence. Nevertheless, by 1941, the college had developed a four-year curriculum and achieved full college status. By 1942, Bethune gave up the presidency, as her health was adversely affected by her many responsibilities. On September 19, 1942, she gave the address at the Los Angeles, California, launching ceremony for the Liberty ship , a ceremony in which Marian Anderson christened the ship.

After making the school's library accessible to the public, it became Florida's first free library accessible to black Floridians.

 Impact on Daytona Beach Community 

 McLeod Hospital 
In the early 1900s, Daytona Beach, Florida, lacked a hospital that would help people of color. Bethune had the idea to start a hospital after an incident involving one of her students. She was called to the bedside of a young female student who fell ill with appendicitis. It was clear that the student needed immediate medical attention. Nevertheless, there was no local hospital to take her to that would treat black people. Bethune demanded that the white physician at the local hospital help the girl. When Bethune went to visit her student, she was asked to enter through the back door. At the hospital, she found that her student had been neglected, ill-cared for, and segregated in an outdoor a hospital. She found a cabin near the school, and through sponsors helping her raise money, she purchased it for five thousand dollars. In 1911, Bethune opened the first black hospital in Daytona, Florida. It started with two beds and, within a few years, held twenty. Both white and black physicians worked at the hospital, along with Bethune's student nurses. This hospital went on to save many black lives within the twenty years that it operated.

During that time, both black and white people in the community relied on help from the McLeod hospital. After an explosion at a nearby construction site, the hospital took in injured black workers. The hospital and its nurses were also praised for their efforts with the 1918 influenza outbreak. During this outbreak, the hospital was full and had to overflow into the school's auditorium. In 1931, Daytona's public hospital, Halifax, agreed to open a separate hospital for people of color. Black people would not fully integrate into the public hospital's main location until the 1960s.

Career as a public leader

 Suffrage activism 
After the passage of the Nineteenth Amendment, which enacted women's suffrage, Bethune continued her efforts to help Blacks gain access to the polls. She solicited donations to help Black voters pay poll taxes, provided tutoring for voter registration literacy tests at Daytona Normal and Industrial Institute, and planned mass voter registration drives.

National Association of Colored Women
In 1896, the National Association of Colored Women (NACW) was formed to promote the needs of black women. Bethune served as the Florida chapter president of the NACW from 1917 to 1925. She worked to register black voters, which was resisted by white society and had been made almost impossible by various obstacles in Florida law and practices controlled by white administrators. She was threatened by members of the resurgent Ku Klux Klan in those years. Bethune also served as the president of the Southeastern Federation of Colored Women's Clubs from 1920 to 1925, which worked to improve opportunities for black women.

She was elected as national president of the NACW in 1924. While the organization struggled to raise funds for regular operations, Bethune envisioned acquiring a headquarters and hiring a professional executive secretary; she implemented this when NACW bought a property at 1318 Vermont Avenue in Washington, DC. She led it to be the first black-controlled organization with headquarters in the capital.

Gaining a national reputation, in 1928, Bethune was invited to attend the Child Welfare Conference called by Republican President Calvin Coolidge. In 1930 President Herbert Hoover appointed her to the White House Conference on Child Health.

Southeastern Association of Colored Women's Clubs
The Southeastern Federation of Colored Women's Clubs (eventually renamed as the Southeastern Association of Colored Women's Clubs) elected Bethune as president after its first conference in 1920 at the Tuskegee Institute. They intended to reach out to Southern women (specifically white women) for support and unity in gaining rights for black women. The women met in Memphis, Tennessee, to discuss interracial problems.

In many respects, all of the women agreed about what needed to be changed until they came to the topic of suffrage. The white women at the conference tried to strike down a resolution on black suffrage. The SACWC responded by issuing a pamphlet entitled Southern Negro Women and Race Co-Operation; it delineated their demands regarding conditions in domestic service, child welfare, conditions of travel, education, lynching, the public press, and voting rights.

The group went on to help register black women to vote after they were granted sufferage resulting from the passage of the constitutional amendment. However, in both Florida and other Southern states, black men and women experienced disenfranchisement by discriminatory application of literacy and comprehension tests and requirements to pay poll taxes, lengthy residency requirements, and governmental insistence upon keeping and displaying relevant records.

National Council of Negro Women
In 1935 Bethune founded the National Council of Negro Women (NCNW) in New York City, bringing together representatives of 28 different organizations to work to improve the lives of black women and their communities. Bethune said of the council:

It is our pledge to make a lasting contribution to all that is finest and best in America, to cherish and enrich her heritage of freedom and progress by working for the integration of all her people regardless of race, creed, or national origin, into her spiritual, social, cultural, civic, and economic life, and thus aid her to achieve the glorious destiny of a true and unfettered democracy.

In 1938, the NCNW hosted the White House Conference on Negro Women and Children, demonstrating the importance of black women in democratic roles. During World War II, the NCNW gained approval for black women to be commissioned as officers in the Women's Army Corps. Bethune also served as a political appointee and the Special Assistant to the Secretary of War during the war.

In the 1990s, the headquarters for the National Council for Negro Women moved to Pennsylvania Avenue, centrally located between the White House and the U.S. Capitol. The former headquarters, where Bethune also lived at one time, has been designated as a National Historic Site.

National Youth Administration
The National Youth Administration (NYA) was a federal agency created under Roosevelt's Works Progress Administration (WPA). It provided programs specifically to promote relief and employment for young people. It focused on unemployed citizens aged sixteen to twenty-five years who were not in school. Bethune lobbied the organization so aggressively and effectively for minority involvement that she earned a full-time staff position in 1936 as an assistant.

Within two years, Bethune was appointed to Director of the Division of Negro Affairs, and became the first African-American female division head. She managed NYA funds to help black students through school-based programs. She was the only black agent of the NYA who was a financial manager. She ensured black colleges participated in the Civilian Pilot Training Program, which graduated some of the first black pilots. The director of the NYA said in 1939: "No one can do what Mrs. Bethune can do."

Bethune's determination helped national officials recognize the need to improve employment for black youth. The NYA's final report, issued in 1943, stated,

more than 300,000 black young men and women were given employment and work training on NYA projects. These projects opened to these youth, training opportunities and enabled the majority of them to qualify for jobs heretofore closed to them.

Within the administration, Bethune advocated for the appointment of black NYA officials to positions of political power. Bethune's administrative assistants served as liaisons between the National Division of Negro Affairs and the NYA agencies on the state and local levels. The high number of administrative assistants composed a workforce commanded by Bethune. They helped gain a better job and salary opportunities for blacks across the country.

During her tenure, Bethune also pushed federal officials to approve a program of consumer education for blacks and a foundation for black disabled children. She planned for studies for black workers' education councils. National officials did not support these due to inadequate funding and fear of duplicating the work of private, non-governmental agencies. The NYA was terminated in 1943.

Black Cabinet

Bethune became a close and loyal friend of Eleanor and Franklin Roosevelt. At the Southern Conference on Human Welfare in 1938, held in Birmingham, Alabama, Eleanor Roosevelt requested a seat next to Bethune despite state segregation laws. Roosevelt also referred to Bethune as "her closest friend in her age group" frequently. Bethune told black voters about the work the Roosevelt Administration did on their behalf and made their concerns known to the Roosevelts. She had unprecedented access to the White House through her relationship with the First Lady.

She used this access to form a coalition of leaders from black organizations called the Federal Council of Negro Affairs, later known as the Black Cabinet. It served as an advisory board to the Roosevelt administration on issues facing black people in America. It was composed of numerous talented blacks, mostly men, who had been appointed to positions in federal agencies. This was the first collective of black people working in higher positions in government.

It suggested to voters that the Roosevelt administration cared about black concerns. The group met in Bethune's office or apartment informally and rarely kept meeting minutes. Although they did not create public policy directly as advisors, they gained the respect of black voters as leaders. They also influenced political appointments and the disbursement of funds to organizations that would benefit black people.

Civil rights
In 1931 the Methodist Church supported merging the Daytona Normal and Industrial School and the Cookman College for Men into Bethune-Cookman College, established first as a junior college. Bethune became a member of the church, but it was segregated in the South. Essentially two organizations operated in the Methodist denomination. Bethune was prominent in the primarily black Florida Conference. While she worked to integrate the mostly white Methodist Episcopal Church, she protested its initial plans for integration because they proposed separate jurisdictions based on race.

Bethune worked to educate both whites and blacks about the accomplishments and needs of black people, writing in 1938,

If our people are to fight their way up out of bondage we must arm them with the sword and the shield and buckler of pride – belief in themselves and their possibilities, based upon a sure knowledge of the achievements of the past.

A year later, she wrote,

Not only the Negro child but children of all races should read and know of the achievements, accomplishments, and deeds of the Negro. World peace and brotherhood are based on a common understanding of the contributions and cultures of all races and creeds.

On Sundays, she opened her school to tourists in Daytona Beach, showing off her students' accomplishments, hosting national speakers on black issues, and taking donations. She ensured that these Community Meetings were integrated.  A black teenager in Daytona at the time later recalled: "Many tourists attended, sitting wherever there were empty seats. There was no special section for white people."

When the U.S. Supreme Court ruled in Brown v. Board of Education (1954) that segregation of public schools was unconstitutional, Bethune defended the decision by writing in the Chicago Defender that year:

There can be no divided democracy, no class government, no half-free county, under the constitution. Therefore, there can be no discrimination, no segregation, no separation of some citizens from the rights which belong to all. ... We are on our way. But these are frontiers that we must conquer. ... We must gain full equality in education ... in the franchise ... in economic opportunity, and full equality in the abundance of life.

Bethune organized the first officer candidate schools for black women. She lobbied federal officials, including Roosevelt, on behalf of African-American women who wanted to join the military.

 United Negro College Fund 
She co-founded the United Negro College Fund (UNCF) on April 25, 1944, with William J. Trent and Frederick D. Patterson. The UNCF is a program which gives many different scholarships, mentorships, and job opportunities to African American and other minority students attending any of the 37 historically black colleges and universities. Trent had joined Patterson and Bethune in raising money for UNCF. The organization started in 1944 and by 1964, Trent had raised over $50 million.

Death and accolades
On May 18, 1955, Bethune died of a heart attack. Her death was followed by editorial tributes in African-American newspapers across the United States. The Oklahoma City Black Dispatch stated she was "Exhibit No. 1 for all who have faith in America and the democratic process." The Atlanta Daily World said her life was "One of the most dramatic careers ever enacted at any time upon the stage of human activity." Moreover, the Pittsburgh Courier wrote, "In any race or nation she would have been an outstanding personality and made a noteworthy contribution because her chief attribute was her indomitable soul."

The mainstream press praised her as well. Christian Century suggested, "the story of her life should be taught to every school child for generations to come." The New York Times noted she was "one of the most potent factors in the growth of interracial goodwill in America." The Washington Post said: "So great were her dynamism and force that it was almost impossible to resist her ... Not only her own people, but all America has been enriched and ennobled by her courageous, ebullient spirit." Her hometown newspaper, the Daytona Beach Evening News printed, "To some, she seemed unreal, something that could not be. ... What right had she to greatness? ... The lesson of Mrs. Bethune's life is that genius knows no racial barriers." McLeod Bethune is buried in Daytona Beach, Florida.

Personal life

Bethune had an "ebony" complexion. She carried a cane for effect, rather than mobility support, stating that it gave her "swank". She was a teetotaler and preached temperance for African Americans, chastising blacks who were intoxicated publicly. Bethune said more than once that the school and the students in Daytona were her first family and that her son and extended family came second. Her students often referred to her as "Mama Bethune".

She was noted for achieving her goals. Dr. Robert Weaver, who also served in Roosevelt's Black Cabinet, said of her, "She had the most marvelous gift of effecting feminine helplessness in order to attain her aims with masculine ruthlessness." When a white Daytona resident threatened Bethune's students with a rifle, Bethune worked to make an ally of him. The director of the McLeod Hospital recalled, "Mrs. Bethune treated him with courtesy and developed such goodwill in him that we found him protecting the children and going so far as to say, 'If anybody bothers old Mary, I will protect her with my life.'"

She prioritised self-sufficiency throughout her life. Bethune invested in several businesses, including the Pittsburgh Courier, a black newspaper, and many life insurance companies. She also founded Central Life Insurance of Florida and later retired in Florida. Due to state segregation, blacks were not allowed to visit the beach. Bethune and several other business owners responded by investing in and purchasing Paradise Beach, a  stretch of beach and the surrounding properties, selling these to black families. They also allowed white families to visit the waterfront. Eventually, Paradise Beach was named Bethune-Volusia Beach in her honor and she even held 25% ownership of the Welricha Motel in Daytona.she was an amazing woman.

 Legacy and honors 

In 1930, journalist Ida Tarbell included Bethune as number 10 on her list of America's greatest women.<ref>{{cite book|last=Bethune|first= Mary McLeod|year= 1999|title=Mary McLeod Bethune: Building a Better World, Essays and Selected Documents, ed. Audrey Thomas McCluskey and Elaine M. Smith|publisher= Indiana University Press|isbn=0253336260}}</ref> Bethune was awarded the Spingarn Medal in 1935 by the NAACP.

In the 1940s, Bethune used her influence and friendship with Eleanor Roosevelt to secure luxury travel buses for Eddie Durham's All-Star Girls Orchestra, an African-American, all-women's swing band.

Bethune was the only black woman present at the founding of the United Nations in San Francisco in 1945, representing the NAACP with W. E. B. Du Bois and Walter White. In 1949, she became the first woman to receive the National Order of Honour and Merit, Haiti's highest award. She served as the U.S. emissary to the induction of President William V.S. Tubman of Liberia in 1949. She also has had essays written about her.

She also served as an adviser to five of the presidents of the United States. Calvin Coolidge and Franklin D. Roosevelt appointed her to several government positions, which included: Special Advisor in Minority Affairs, director of the Division of Negro Affairs of the National Youth Administration, and chair of Federal Council of Negro Affairs. Among her honors, she was an assistant director of the Women's Army Corps. She was also an honorary member of Delta Sigma Theta sorority.

In 1973, Bethune was inducted into the National Women's Hall of Fame. On July 10, 1974, the anniversary of her 99th birthday, the Mary McLeod Bethune Memorial, by artist Robert Berks, was erected in her honor in Lincoln Park (Washington, D.C.) It was the first monument honoring an African American or a woman to be installed in a public park in the District of Columbia.

At least 18,000 people attended the unveiling ceremony, although one estimate claims that approximately 250,000 people attended, including Shirley Chisholm, the first African-American woman elected to Congress. The funds for the monument were raised by the National Council of Negro Women.  The inscription on the pedestal reads "let her works praise her" (a biblical reference to Proverbs 31:31), while the side is engraved with a passage from her "Last Will and Testament":

I leave you to love. I leave you to hope. I leave you the challenge of developing confidence in one another. I leave you a thirst for education. I leave you a respect for the use of power. I leave your faith. I leave you racial dignity. I leave you a desire to live harmoniously with your fellow men. I leave you a responsibility to our young people.

In 1985, the U.S. Postal Service issued a stamp in Bethune's honor.  In 1989 Ebony magazine listed her as one of "50 Most Important Figures in Black American History." In 1999, Ebony included her as one of the "100 Most Fascinating Black Women of the 20th century." In 1991, the International Astronomical Union named a crater on planet Venus in her honor.

In 1994, the National Park Service acquired Bethune's last residence, the NACW Council House at 1318 Vermont Avenue. The former headquarters was designated as the Mary McLeod Bethune Council House National Historic Site.

Schools have been named in her honor in Los Angeles, Chicago, San Diego, Dallas, Phoenix, Palm Beach, Florida, Moreno Valley, California, Minneapolis, Ft. Lauderdale, Atlanta, Philadelphia, Folkston and College Park, Georgia, New Orleans, Rochester, New York, Cleveland, South Boston, Virginia, Jacksonville, Florida, and Milwaukee, Wisconsin.

In 2002, scholar Molefi Kete Asante listed Bethune on his list of 100 Greatest African Americans.

In 2004, Bethune-Cookman University celebrated its hundredth anniversary from its founding as a primary school. The former 2nd Avenue on one side of the university was renamed Mary McLeod Bethune Boulevard. The university's website says, "the vision of the founder remains in full view over one-hundred years later. The institution prevails in order that others might improve their heads, hearts, and hands." The university's vice president recalled her legacy: "During Mrs. Bethune's time, this was the only place in the city of Daytona Beach where Whites and Blacks could sit in the same room and enjoy what she called 'gems from students'—their recitations and songs. This is a person who was able to bring Black people and White together."

An historical marker in Mayesville, Sumter County, South Carolina, commemorates her birthplace.

The Legislature of Florida in 2018 designated her as the subject of one of Florida's two statues in the National Statuary Hall Collection, replacing Confederate General Edmund Kirby Smith.

The Mary McLeod Bethune Scholarship Program, for Floridian students wishing to attend historically black colleges and universities within the state, is named in her honor.

A statue of Bethune in Jersey City, New Jersey was dedicated in 2021 in a namesake park across the street from the Mary McLeod Bethune Life Center.

A statue of Mary McLeod Bethune was unveiled on July 13, 2022 in the United States Capitol, making her the first black American represented in the National Statuary Hall Collection.

Schools named for Mary M. Bethune 

California
 Dr. Mary McLeod Bethune Middle School, Los Angeles, California
 Mary McLeod Bethune Elementary School Moreno Valley, California

Florida
 Bethune Academy, formally known as Bethune Elementary – Haines City, Florida
 Bethune-Cookman University, Daytona Beach, Florida
 Mary M. Bethune Elementary School, Hollywood, Florida
 Dr. Mary McLeod Bethune Elementary School, Riviera Beach, Florida

Georgia
 Mary McLeod Bethune Middle School, Decatur, Georgia

Louisiana
 Mary McLeod Bethune Elementary School, New Orleans, Louisiana
 Mary M. Bethune High School, Norco, Louisiana (closed when schools integrated)

Michigan
 Mary McLeod Bethune Elementary-Middle School, Detroit, Michigan

Minnesota
 Mary McLeod Bethune Community School, Minneapolis, Minnesota

Missouri
 Mary Bethune School for Black Children, Weston, Missouri

Mississippi
 Mary Bethune Alternative School, Hattiesburg, Mississippi

New York
 Mary McLeod Bethune School No. 45, Rochester, New York

Ohio
 Mary McLeod Bethune K-8, Cleveland, Ohio

Pennsylvania
 Mary McLeod Bethune School, Philadelphia, Pennsylvania

South Carolina
 Bethune Bowman Middle High School, Rowesville, South Carolina

Texas
 Bethune Academy (now merged with Anderson Academy), Houston, Texas
 Mary McLeod Bethune Elementary School Dallas, Texas

Virginia
 Mary M. Bethune High School, Halifax, Virginia (converted into an office complex for the local government following integration)

See also

 African-American history
 African-American literature
 List of African-American writers
 List of people on stamps of the United States

References

Further reading

External links

 Bethune-Cookman University
 National Council of Negro Women
 Bethune's home as a historical landmark in Daytona
 The Mary McLeod Bethune Council House: African American Women Unite for Change, a National Park Service Teaching with Historic Places (TwHP) lesson plan
 Biography and Bethune's impact on Volusia County (Daytona Beach), Florida
 Mary McLeod Bethune with a Line of Girls from the School from the World Digital Library
 "A Passion for Social Equality: Mary McLeod Bethune's Race Woman Leadership and the New Deal," a political biography
 Mary McLeod Bethune, the NCNW, and the Prewar Push for Equal Opportunity in Defense Projects
 Thomas, Rhondda R. & Ashton, Susanna, eds. (2014). The South Carolina Roots of African American Thought. Columbia: University of South Carolina Press. "Mary Jane McLeod Bethune (1875–1955)," p. 163–167.
 Uniforms at A History of Central Florida Podcast

 Mary McLeod Bethune Biography, Biography.com, February 25, 2015
 Encyclopedia of Race and Racism
 Michals, Debra.  "Mary McLeod Bethune".  National Women's History Museum.  2015.
 Part of her life is retold in the radio drama "One out of Seventeen", a presentation from Destination Freedom

Mary McLeod Bethune
1875 births
1955 deaths
African-American educators
Activists for African-American civil rights
Johnson C. Smith University alumni
American political consultants
Bethune–Cookman University people
Moody Bible Institute alumni
People from Mayesville, South Carolina
People from Palatka, Florida
People from Daytona Beach, Florida
University and college founders
Writers from Florida
Writers from South Carolina
Writers from Washington, D.C.
Spingarn Medal winners
African-American history of South Carolina
African-American Methodists
Barber–Scotia College alumni
Heads of universities and colleges in the United States
Women heads of universities and colleges
American temperance activists
Delta Sigma Theta members
Black Cabinet
Presidents of the National Association of Colored Women's Clubs
American academic administrators
African-American schoolteachers
Schoolteachers from Florida
American women educators
African-American history of Florida
American suffragists
Florida Women's Hall of Fame Inductees